Stillwater Township may refer to:

Stillwater Township, Washington County, Minnesota
Stillwater Township, New Jersey
Stillwater Township, North Dakota
Stillwater Township, a former township in Payne County, Oklahoma

See also
Stillwater (disambiguation)

Township name disambiguation pages